Yoo Young-sil (born May 1, 1975) is a retired South Korean football player who was a member of South Korea women's national football team.

International career 
Yoo began her international career as an 18-year-old defender. Yoo made her first appearance selection during 1993 AFC Women's Championship finals against Malaysia and scored debut goal in same game. Yoo was a part of 2003 FIFA Women's World Cup for South Korea. On 6 October 2008, Yoo announced her retirement and started to coach.

Honors

Korea Republic
 Women's East Asian Cup Winner : 2005

Individual
 Women's East Asian Cup Best defender : 2005

References

1973 births
Living people
South Korean women's footballers
South Korea women's international footballers
WK League players
Women's association football defenders
Sportspeople from South Jeolla Province
Kyung Hee University alumni
Incheon Hyundai Steel Red Angels WFC players
2003 FIFA Women's World Cup players
Footballers at the 1994 Asian Games
Footballers at the 1998 Asian Games
Asian Games competitors for South Korea